Dolakha, often known as Dolkha or Dholkha (Nepal Bhasa:दोलखा जिल्ला)), a part of Bagmati Province, is one of the seventy-seven districts of Nepal. It is a district with a strong religious affiliation. It is popularly known amongst most Nepalese for the temple of Dolakha Bhimeshawor.

The name Dolkha arose from Newar Community. In the classical Nepal Bhasa language "Dol" or "Dwal" means Thousand, and "Kha" means houses which means "The place that have thousand houses".

Bhimeshwar Temple
The Bhimeshwar temple is located in Dolakha Bazar of Bhimeshwar. The main statue of this temple is God Bhim. Bhimsen, Bhimeshwar, or Bhim of Dolakha is noted as one of the most popular throughout the country. He was the second prince of Panch Pandav and notably worshiped by the traders or merchandisers as their god. In Dolakha, the roofless temple constitutes the idol of Bhimsen, which is triangular in shape and made of rough stone. The idol in the temple is said to resemble three different gods: Bhimeshwar in the morning, Mahadeva during the day and the Narayana in the evening.

Local legend has it that ages ago, 12 porters coming from elsewhere stopped at this spot and made three stone stoves to cook rice. After a few minutes, it was noticed that one side of the rice grains was cooked but the other side was raw. When the Porter flipped the cooked side up, the cooked rice became raw again when it came in contact with the triangular-shaped black-stone. One of the porters became very angry and stabbed the stone with "Paneu" (laddle), which cut the stone and out of the cut flowed blood coated with milk. Later they realized that the stone is God Bhim. Worshippers started pouring in to pray to God Bhim. There are many faith-challenging incidents about the Bhimsen of Dolakha. The miraculous things of Bhimsen statue of Dolakha include sweating fluid like drops of warm water. People believe that if any bad incident is happening or going to happen in near future in the country then Bhimsen himself tries to protect his people by warning them through sweating etc.

From the point of view of Shree Bhimeshwar Shivapuran, there was a kingdom of Bhima that was blessed by God Brahma at the side of a mountain peak. The people, who lived in the Bhima's kingdom had to live very sorrowful lives from the Bhima and so they prayed to god Shiva to save their lives. Then God Shiva came from Gaurishanker and killed the king Bhima. According to the history after Bhima's death, the statue of God at that spot was named -Bhimeshwar (भिमेश्वर).

Dolakha is also home to another holy temple - Kalinchowk Bhagawati.  It is situated in high mountains at an altitude of about 3842m and the pilgrims are known to walk a long and dangerous route via the mountains to the temple. But, in 2018 the government started a new cable car service for the comfort of the pilgrims. The temple is believed to have strong spiritual power and known to fulfill the prayer of the pilgrims.

Geography and climate

Demographics

At the time of the 2011 Nepal census, Dolakha District had a population of 186,557. Of these, 65.2% spoke Nepali, 15.9% Tamang, 8.0% Thami, 4.5% Sherpa, 2.3% Jirel, 1.9% Newari, 0.9% Sunuwar, 0.3% Magar, 0.2% Maithili, 0.1% Bengali, 0.1% Majhi, 0.1% Surel and 0.1% other languages as their first language.

In terms of ethnicity/caste, 33.4% were Chhetri, 16.8% Tamang, 9.4% Newar, 9.2% Hill Brahmin, 9.0% Thami, 4.8% Sherpa, 4.3% Kami, 2.4% Jirel, 2.2% Damai/Dholi, 2.2% Sarki, 1.6% Magar, 1.5% Gharti/Bhujel, 1.0% Sunuwar, 0.7% Sanyasi/Dasnami, 0.5% Gurung, 0.2% Majhi, 0.2% Thakuri, 0.1% Badi, 0.1% Rai and 0.3% others.

In terms of religion, 67.8% were Hindu, 22.3% Buddhist, 8.1% Prakriti, 1.6% Christian and 0.1% others.

In terms of literacy, 62.5% could read and write, 3.5% could only read and 33.9% could neither read nor write.

Administration
The district consists of 9 Municipalities, out of which two are urban municipalities and seven are rural municipalities. These are as follows:
Bhimeswor Municipality
Jiri Municipality
Kalinchok Rural Municipality
Melung Rural Municipality
Bigu Rural Municipality
Gaurishankar Rural Municipality
Baiteshwor Rural Municipality
Sailung Rural Municipality
Tamakoshi Rural Municipality

Former Municipalities and Village Development Committees (VDCs)

Prior to the restructuring of the district, Dolakha consisted of the following municipalities and Village development committees:

 Alampu
 Babare
 Bhedapu
 Bhimeshwar Municipality
 Bhirkot
 Bhusapheda
 Bigu
 Bocha
 Bulung
 Chankhu
 Chhetrapa
 Chilankha
 Chyama
 Dadhpokhari
 Dandakharka
 Dolakha Town
 Gairimudi
 Gauri Sankar
 Ghang Sukathokar
 Hawa
 Japhe
 Jhule
 Jhyaku
 Jiri Municipality
 Jugu
 Kabhre
 Kalinchok
 Katakuti
 Khare
 Khupachagu
 Laduk
 Lakuri Danda
 Lamabagar
 Lamidanda
 Lapilang
 Magapauwa
 Makaibari
 Mali, now Jiri Mun.
 Malu
 Marbu
 Mati
 Melung
 Mirge
 Namdu
 Orang
 Pawati
 Phasku
 Sahare
 Shailungeshwar
 Sunakhani
 Sundrawati
 Suri
 Susma Chhemawati
 Syama
 Thulopatal, now Jiri Mun.

Gallery

See also
Zones of Nepal
Dolakha Newar Language
Thangmi language
Informative page about Dolakha

References

 

 
Districts of Nepal established in 1962
Districts of Bagmati Province